J. Chris Ullo (March 16, 1928 – January 16, 2014) was an American politician. He served as a Democratic member of the Louisiana House of Representatives. Ullo also served as a member for the 8th district of the Louisiana State Senate.

Life and career
Born in Marrero, Louisiana, Ullo attended Marrero High School. He then went on to Tulane University.

In 1972, Ullo was elected to serve as a member of the Louisiana House of Representatives. He was succeeded by Steve Theriot. Ullo served from May 1972 to March 1988. After that, he was elected to represent 8th district of the Louisiana State Senate. Ullo succeeded Elwyn Nicholson and was later succeeded by John Alario in 2008.

Ullo died in January 2014 at the East Jefferson General Hospital in Metairie, Louisiana, at the age of 85.

References 

1928 births
2014 deaths
People from Marrero, Louisiana
Democratic Party members of the Louisiana House of Representatives
Democratic Party Louisiana state senators
20th-century American politicians
21st-century American politicians
Tulane University alumni